WASP-21 is a G-type star (spectral type G3V) that is reaching the end of its main sequence lifetime  approximately 850 light years from Earth in the constellation of Pegasus. The star is relatively metal-poor, having 40% of heavy elements compared to the Sun. Kinematically, WASP-21 belongs to the thick disk of the Milky Way. It has an exoplanet named WASP-21b. 

The survey in 2012 have failed to find any stellar companions to WASP-21.

Naming
In 2019 the WASP-21 system was chosen as part of the NameExoWorlds campaign organised by the International Astronomical Union, which assigned each country a star and planet to be named.  WASP-21 was assigned to Bulgaria.  The winning proposal named the star Tangra after a deity worshipped by the early Bulgars, and the planet Bendida after a deity worshipped by the Thracians.

Planetary System
In 2010 WASP-21 was discovered to host a hot Jupiter type planet by the Wide Angle Search for Planets (WASP). and confirmed by radial velocity by the WASP team in 2010.

Transit-timing variation analysis in 2015 did not find an additional planets in the system.

In 2020, spectroscopic analysis has found the WASP-21 b atmosphere is mostly cloudless and contains sodium.

References

Pegasus (constellation)
Planetary systems with one confirmed planet
G-type main-sequence stars
Tangra
J23095825+1823459
21